Eskilsson may refer to:

Bengta Eskilsson (1836–1923), pioneering Swedish textile artist
Christofer Eskilsson (born 1989), Swedish diver
Erik Eskilsson, Sami man accused in the Arjeplog blasphemy trial of 1687 
Gustav Eskilsson (born 1992), Swedish curler
Hans Eskilsson (born 1966), Swedish former professional footballer
Peter Eskilsson (1820–1872), Swedish genre painter
Sture Eskilsson (1930–2016), Swedish economist